Simunye is a sugar mill town on the lowveld in eastern Eswatini.  Almost all of the residents of the town work for the Royal Eswatini Sugar Corporation's sugar mill located nearby.

Sport
The town is home to the Royal Leopards F.C. RSSC United FC is a football club that was the result of the merger between Mhlume United and Simunye FC.

Schools
The town which is an RESC Estate town, has a number of schools and pre-schools. Thembelisha Preparatory School is the only private Primary school. There are two Government-aided primary schools, Ngomane primary school and Lusoti Primary school. Likewise, there are two High Schools, Ngomane High School and Lusoti HIgh School.

References

Populated places in Eswatini